This is a list of the members of the Australian House of Representatives in the 10th Australian Parliament, which was elected at the 1925 election on 14 November 1925. The incumbent Nationalist Party of Australia led by Prime Minister of Australia Stanley Bruce in power since 1922 with coalition partner the Country Party led by Earle Page defeated the opposition Australian Labor Party led by Matthew Charlton.  The Nationalist won 11 seats, they did not take at the 1922 election, although five of them were held by Liberal Party members, who had joined the Nationalist government after Bruce became Prime Minister in February 1923.

Notes

References

Members of Australian parliaments by term
20th-century Australian politicians